Duddridge is an English surname. Notable people with the surname include:

James Duddridge (born 1971), British politician
Paul Duddridge (born 1966), British writer, comedy agent, producer, and director

English-language surnames